Kumarasamy, known by his stage name, Kovai Senthil, was a Tamil film character artist who appeared in Tamil films starting with Bhagyaraj's Oru Kai Osai. He appeared in over 400 Tamil films.

Career 
During his career, Kovai Senthil made several collaborations with Bhagyaraj including Aararo Aariraro and Avasara Police 100. He has starred in several notable films including Idhu Namma Aalu, Padayappa, Avvai Shanmugi and Goa.

Selected filmography
This list is incomplete; you can help by expanding it.

Oru Kai Osai (1980)
Mouna Geethangal (1981)
Idhu Namma Aalu (1988)
En Rathathin Rathame (1989)
Aararo Aariraro (1989)
Palaivana Paravaigal (1990)
Avasara Police 100 (1990)
Thalattu Ketkuthamma (1991)
Chinna Pasanga Naanga (1992) as Vellaisamy 
Rajakumaran (1994)
En Rajangam (1994)
En Aasai Machan (1994)
Mettupatti Mirasu (1994)
Sathyavan (1994)
Nattamai (1994)
Vaa Magale Vaa (1994)
Mani Rathnam (1994) as conductor
Deva (1995) as Koyil Poosari
Minor Mappillai (1996) as Bus Conductor
Avvai Shanmughi (1996)
Minsara Kanavu (1997)
Moovendhar (1998) as Astrologer
Natpukkaga (1998) as Iyer
Unnidathil Ennai Koduthen (1998) as House owner
Annan (1999) as Ayyakannu 
Padayappa (1999) as village man
Kadhalar Dhinam (1999)
Vaanathaippola (2000)
Simmasanam (2000)
Jjunction (2002) as Bhama's father
Unnai Ninaithu (2002) as Producer's Mad son
Album (2002)
Style (2002) as Swamy
Lesa Lesa (2003)
Thirumalai (2003)
Joot (2003) as doctor
Soori (2003) as Iyer
Aai (2004) as Achari
Theeyavan (2008) as Arivu's father
Sandai (2008) as Astrologer
Kadhalna Summa Illai (2009)
Pinju Manasu (2009) as Rickshaw puller
Goa (2010)
Thamizh Padam (2010) as Kanakku (Nattamai's assistant)
 Minsaram (2011) as Tamil professor
 Poojai (2014) 
Adhibar (2015) as Broker
Mudinja Ivana Pudi / Kotigobba 2 (2016)
Anbudan Anbarasi (2016) as Meesaikkaran
Tharisu Nilam (2017)
Ayyanar Veethi (2017)
Sattham (2019) as Hospital agent
Ninaive Nee (2023)

Death
He died in 2018 due to age related issues. Kovai Senthil was 74 years old during his death.

References

External links 

Tamil comedians
2018 deaths
Year of birth missing
Male actors from Tamil Nadu
Place of birth missing
Date of birth missing
Indian male comedians